This is a list of Portuguese administrative divisions  by GDP and GDP per capita.

List of administrative divisions by GDP 
Administrative divisions by GDP in 2015 according to data by the OECD.

List of administrative divisions by GDP per capita 
Administrative divisions by GDP per capita in 2015 according to data by the OECD.

References 

Administrative divisions by GDP
Gross state product
Portugal
GDP